Gautami Deshpande is an Indian television actress and singer. She is known for Sai in Majha Hoshil Na which is aired on Zee Marathi. She is the sister of Marathi actress Mrunmayee Deshpande.

Early life and career 
Gautami was born in Pune, Maharashtra on 31 January 1993. She completed her mechanical engineering degree in 2014. After graduating, she worked in an Siemens IT firm, Pune for 4 years before working as an actor. She began her journey as an actor by working in theatre. She started doing it when she was in college. She made her debut in 2018 with Marathi daily soap Saare Tujhyachsathi which was aired on Sony Marathi. She is also a good singer. She has also sung for the Mann Fakiraa film.  She appeared in Majha Hoshil Na as Sai.

Filmography

Television

Music video

Discography

Awards

References

External links 

 Gautami Deshpande on IMDb
biography of gautami deshpande in marathi

Living people
Actresses from Pune
21st-century Indian actresses
Indian television actresses
Marathi actors
Actresses in Hindi cinema
Actresses in Marathi television
Marathi playback singers
1993 births